Jamesie Brennan (born 7 December 1969) is an Irish retired hurler who played as a left corner-forward for the Kilkenny senior team.

Brennan made his first appearance for the team during the 1990-91 National League and was a regular member of the starting fifteen until his retirement after the 1995 championship. An All-Ireland-winning captain in the under-21 grade, Brennan later won two All-Ireland medals and three Leinster medals at senior level.

At club level Brennan played with Erin's Own and O'Tooles GAA in Dublin winning the Dublin Senior Hurling Championship with the northside club.

James Brennan now works for South Dublin County Council.

References

1969 births
Living people
Erin's Own (Kilkenny) hurlers
O'Tooles hurlers
Kilkenny Gaelic footballers
Kilkenny inter-county hurlers
Dublin inter-county hurlers
All-Ireland Senior Hurling Championship winners